Hind Institute of Medical Sciences is a private medical college hospital which is located near Lucknow city in Barabanki district, in Safedabad in Uttar Pradesh, India.
It was established in 2005 and the medical College began its operation in 2009.  The college is recognized by the Medical Council of India (MCI) and is also accredited by the National Assessment and Accreditation Council (NAAC).

HIMS offers undergraduate and postgraduate courses in various medical specialties. The undergraduate course offered is Bachelor of Medicine and Bachelor of Surgery (MBBS), which has an intake capacity of 150 students per year.

References

Private medical colleges in India
Medical colleges in Uttar Pradesh
Barabanki district
2005 establishments in Uttar Pradesh
Educational institutions established in 2009
Hospitals established in 2005
Hospitals in Uttar Pradesh